Stefano Maarten Seedorf (born 28 April 1982, in Zaanstad) is a retired Dutch footballer. After retiring, he worked as a fitness coach.

Career

Early career 
Stefano Seedorf started his playing career with amateur side Hellas Sport, but like his cousins he would soon be discovered by Ajax.

Ajax 
After rising through the ranks with players such as Serginho Greene (Feyenoord) and Youssouf Hersi (Vitesse Arnhem) he made his debut in the first team line-up on 30 April 2002, just 2 days after his 20th birthday. However, after 2 years and just 5 league matches Stefano was sent away on a loan spell with NAC Breda.

After Ajax 
In NAC Breda Stefano made an immediate impact. He proliferated himself as a fast paced technical midfielder and scored 7 goals in 29 matches. Despite his successful performance with NAC, his contract with Ajax was not extended. In the summer of 2004 Seedorf was therefore transferred to FC Groningen.

In 2009–10, Stefano and his cousin Chedric left for the Italian team Monza.

In February 2013, Stefano joined Brazilian club Alecrim.

Personal life 
Stefano is the cousin of Clarence, Jürgen, Chedric, Rahmlee Seedorf and his uncle Johan Seedorf is his player agent.

References

External links
Ajax Squads 1993–99
Voetball International Profile – Stefano Seedorf 
Profile – Monza

1982 births
Living people
Footballers from Zaanstad
Dutch sportspeople of Surinamese descent
Association football midfielders
Dutch footballers
AFC Ajax players
NAC Breda players
FC Groningen players
Apollon Limassol FC players
Veria F.C. players
A.C. Monza players
Alecrim Futebol Clube players
AFC Ajax (amateurs) players
Eredivisie players
Eerste Divisie players
Cypriot First Division players
Super League Greece players
Dutch expatriate footballers
Expatriate footballers in Brazil
Expatriate footballers in Cyprus
Expatriate footballers in Greece
Expatriate footballers in Italy
Stefano